The Cabinet of Édouard Adolphe Mortier was announced on 18 November 1834 by King Louis Philippe I.
It replaced the Cabinet of Hugues-Bernard Maret.

The ministry was headed by Marshal Édouard Mortier, duc de Trévise, who accepted the position out of loyalty to the king.
He was not an experienced parliamentarian and was unable to command respect. On 20 February 1835 he submitted his resignation.
The cabinet was replaced on 12 March 1835 by the Cabinet of Victor de Broglie.

Ministers
The cabinet was created by ordinance of 18 November 1834. The ministers were:

References

Sources

French governments
1834 establishments in France
1835 disestablishments in France
Cabinets established in 1834
Cabinets disestablished in 1835